Manuel 'Manolo' Herrero Maestre (born 10 October 1967) is a Spanish retired footballer who played as a midfielder, and a current coach.

Playing career
Born in Villena, Province of Alicante, Herrero played five consecutive seasons in La Liga, starting with Real Murcia then spending two years with Sevilla FC. His best input in the top division was 24 games in 1987–88, helping the former team narrowly avoid relegation after finishing 17th.

After three campaigns in the second division with CD Castellón, Herrero played the rest of his career in the lower leagues, retiring in June 2002 with Jumilla CF at the age of nearly 35.

Managing career
Immediately after retiring, Herrero begun his coaching career, starting with Palamós CF in the third level. In the following years he worked exclusively in the lower divisions and in his native Valencian Community, being in charge of Elche CF Ilicitano, Villajoyosa CF (two spells), CD Alcoyano, CD Eldense and UD Alzira.

In the 2011–12 season, Herrero was Alicante CF's director of football, as the division four club was overwhelmed with financial difficulties.

References

External links

1967 births
Living people
People from Alto Vinalopó
Sportspeople from the Province of Alicante
Spanish footballers
Footballers from the Valencian Community
Association football midfielders
La Liga players
Segunda División players
Segunda División B players
Tercera División players
Real Murcia Imperial players
Real Murcia players
Sevilla FC players
CD Castellón footballers
Levante UD footballers
CD Eldense footballers
Ontinyent CF players
Spanish football managers
Palamós CF managers
Elche CF Ilicitano managers
CD Alcoyano managers
CD Eldense managers
CF Gandía players